"Don't Be Afraid" is the sixth single from freestyle group TKA's debut album Scars of Love.

Charts

References

1988 singles
TKA songs
1987 songs
Tommy Boy Records singles
Songs written by Tony Moran